Niobrara River Bridge may refer to:

Adamson Bridge, near Valentine, Nebraska, also known as Niobrara River Bridge and as NEHBS No. CE00-227, listed on the National Register of Historic Places (NRHP) in Cherry County
Bell Bridge, near Valentine, Nebraska, also known as the Allen Bridge and Niobrara River Bridge and NEHBS No. CE00-22, also NRHP-listed in Cherry County
Berry State Aid Bridge, near Valentine, Nebraska, also known as Niobrara River Bridge and as NEHBS No. CE00-225, also NRHP-listed in Cherry County
Borman Bridge, near Valentine, Nebraska, also known as Niobrara River Bridge and NEHBS No. CE00-224, also NRHP-listed in Cherry County
Brewer Bridge, near Valentine, Nebraska, also known as Niobrara River Bridge and NEHBS No. CE00-226, built 1899, also NRHP-listed in Cherry County 
Colclesser Bridge, near Rushville, Nebraska, also NRHP-listed in Sheridan County
Loosveldt Bridge, near Rushville, Nebraska, also NRHP-listed in Sheridan County
Niobrara River Bridge (Niobrara State Park, Nebraska), near Niobrara, Nebraska, NRHP-listed in Knox County